Bologna Cathedral (Cattedrale di Bologna), dedicated to Saint Peter, is the cathedral of Bologna in Italy, and the seat and the metropolitan cathedral of the Archbishop of Bologna. Most of the present building dates from the 17th century, with a few parts from the late 16th century.

History 

There was already a cathedral on the site (on the present Via Indipendenza) in 1028, accompanied by a pre-Romanesque campanile with a circular base (in the architectural tradition of Ravenna). This church was destroyed by a devastating fire in 1141. It was reconstructed, and consecrated by Pope Lucius III in 1184.

In 1396 a high portico (protiro) was added to the west front, which was rebuilt in 1467. From about 1477 the Ferrarese painters Francesco del Cossa and Ercole de' Roberti worked in the Garganelli Chapel on the creation of a cycle of frescoes which later had a significant influence on Niccolò dell'Arca and Michelangelo. The frescoes were lost in subsequent reconstruction except for a very few fragments.

In 1582 Pope Gregory XIII elevated the Bishop of Bologna to Archbishop, and accordingly the cathedral was elevated to the rank of "metropolitan church" (a bishop's seat with jurisdiction over other bishops and dioceses in its territory).

By order of Cardinal Gabriele Paleotti a radical remodelling of the interior of the building began in 1575, of which the crypt and the Greater Chapel (Capella Maggiore) survive. The alterations were so extensive however as to cause the vaults to collapse in 1599, and the decision was then made to rebuild the main part of the cathedral from scratch. Work on the new building started in 1605. A new façade was added between 1743 and 1747, to designs by the architect Alfonso Torreggiani, on the instructions of Pope Benedict XIV.

Description 

The present interior is emphatically Baroque, giving an impression of majesty and grandeur. Among the works of art are an Annunciation by Ludovico Carracci (a fresco in the central lunette of the presbytery), a Romanesque Crucifixion in cedarwood, and a sculptured group in terracotta depicting the Compianto su Cristo morto ("Lament over the Dead Christ"), by Alfonso Lombardi, of the early 16th century. In the apse are early 20th-century paintings by Cesare Mauro Trebbi (1847–1931) including Saint Anne in Glory.

Campanile
The early campanile with the circular base has never been rebuilt, although from the 13th century onwards it has often been suggested that it should be, and the ancient internal structure is still visible.

The bell tower accommodates the bell known as "La Nonna", which at a weight of 3300 kilograms is the largest bell that can be rung by the Bolognese method of bell-ringing.

Notes

Sources

Website of the Archdiocese of Bologna: Cathedral 
Website of the Direzione Regionale per i Beni Culturali e Paesagistici della Emilia-Romagna: Chiesa cattedrale metropolitana di San Pietro 

Buildings and structures completed in 1148
12th-century Roman Catholic church buildings in Italy
Roman Catholic churches completed in 1747
18th-century Roman Catholic church buildings in Italy
Roman Catholic cathedrals in Italy
Cathedrals in Emilia-Romagna
Roman Catholic churches in Bologna